Shaikha Khokhar obtained the throne of Khokhar tribe after the death of his brother, Nusrat Khokhar. His brother Nusrat Khokhar was the governor of Lahore and Chief of the Khokhar Tribal Confederation. Timur attacked Lahore and burned Nusrat's residence during the invasion, killing him. Shaikha Khokhar succeeded his brother Nusrat as the Chief of the Khokhar Tribal Confederation and he wanted to take revenge on Timur for the killing of his brother so he gathered a large force made up mainly of tribal Khokhars and non-Khokhar soldiers too. After seeing the large Timurid army stationed near Lahore, Shaikha Khokhar attacked Timur. Shaikha Khokhar was defeated and killed in battle against the Timurid force and his army was routed.

References 

History of Punjab
15th-century Indian monarchs
14th-century Indian monarchs